Lieutenant General Howard W. Penney (December 5, 1918 – June 25, 2004) of United States Army, was first director of Defense Mapping Agency from July 1972 to August 1974. Under Penney's leadership, the new agency focused its assets into a decentralized structure with a lean staff to respond to the rising demands for geographic information by a variety of military users.

Early life, and education
Lieutenant General Penney attended the University of Detroit, and graduated with a BS from the United States Military Academy in 1940. He earned an MS in civil engineering at Texas A&M University in June 1949. He completed the United States Army Command and General Staff College in June 1952, and the National War College in June 1959.

Defense Mapping Agency
In response to President Nixon’s directive of July 1971, Lieutenant General Penney consolidated the Department of Defense's military mapping, charting and geodesy (MC&G) activities and created DMA. Under his leadership from July 1972 to August 1974, the new agency focused these assets into a decentralized structure with a very lean staff to respond to the high demands for geographic information by military users.

Awards, and decorations
In 2001 Lt. Gen. Penney was inducted into the inaugural class of the National Geospatial-Intelligence Agency Hall of Fame, where he is credited for "helping the military overcome doubts as to whether or not DMA could meet their needs." His military decorations and awards include:
 Distinguished Service Medal with oak leaf cluster
 Legion of Merit with oak leaf cluster
 Bronze Star Medal with oak leaf Cluster
 Army Commendation Ribbon with oak leaf cluster
 Asiatic–Pacific Campaign Medal
 American Campaign Medal
 American Defense Service Medal
 World War II Victory Medal
 Army Occupation Medal (Japan)
 Philippine Liberation Ribbon
 National Defense Service Medal
 Armed Forces Expeditionary Medal
 Republic of Vietnam Service Medal
 Vietnamese Service Medal
 General Staff Identification Badge
 Supreme Headquarters Allied Powers Europe Badge

References
Citations

Sources

 

United States Military Academy alumni
Texas A&M University alumni
United States Army Command and General Staff College alumni
National War College alumni
Recipients of the Distinguished Service Medal (US Army)
Recipients of the Legion of Merit
1918 births
2004 deaths